The 1924 U.S. National Championships (now known as the US Open) was a tennis tournament that took place on the outdoor grass courts at the West Side Tennis Club, Forest Hills in New York City, United States. The women's tournament was held from 11 August until 16 August while the men's tournament ran from 25 August until 2 September. It was the 44th staging of the U.S. National Championships and the third Grand Slam tennis event of the year.

Finals

Men's singles

 Bill Tilden defeated  Bill Johnston  6–1, 9–7, 6–2

Women's singles

 Helen Wills defeated  Molla Mallory  6–1, 6–3

Men's doubles
 Howard Kinsey /  Robert Kinsey defeated  Gerald Patterson /  Pat O'Hara Wood 7–5, 5–7, 7–9, 6–3, 6–4

Women's doubles
 Hazel Hotchkiss Wightman /  Helen Wills defeated  Eleanor Goss /  Marion Zinderstein Jessup 6–4, 6–3

Mixed doubles
 Helen Wills /  Vincent Richards defeated  Molla Mallory /  Bill Tilden 6–8, 7–5, 6–0

References

External links
Official US Open website

 
U.S. National Championships
U.S. National Championships (tennis) by year
U.S. National Championships
U.S. National Championships
U.S. National Championships
U.S. National Championships